Gyula Illés (born 9 November 1982 in Vásárosnamény, Hungary) is a Hungarian footballer currently plays for Dhaka Abahani.

References

External links
HLSZ 

1982 births
Living people
People from Vásárosnamény
Hungarian footballers
Association football midfielders
Mátészalka FC players
Nyíregyháza Spartacus FC players
Bőcs KSC footballers
Baktalórántháza VSE footballers
Zalaegerszegi TE players
Debreceni VSC players
Gyirmót FC Győr players
Nemzeti Bajnokság I players
Sportspeople from Szabolcs-Szatmár-Bereg County